The Geelong Field Naturalists Club (GFNC) is an Australian regional amateur scientific natural history and conservation society which was founded in 1961 by Trevor Pescott.  It is based in Geelong, Victoria, with the aims of:
 preserving and protecting native flora and fauna
 promoting the conservation of natural resources and the protection of endangered species and habitats, and
 recording information and knowledge about the flora and fauna of the Geelong region

The GFNC, with its president at the time, Jack Wheeler, was instrumental in the early 1960s in establishing the Ocean Grove Nature Reserve.  The logo of the club features the small ant-blue butterfly, an endangered myrmecophilous species that used to be found in the reserve.

Publications
The GFNC publishes a monthly magazine, the Geelong Naturalist, as well as the annual Geelong Bird Report.  It also publishes books on the natural history of the Geelong region.

References

Further reading
 Daly, Charles; Pescott, Edward Edgar; Hill, Mrs E.E.; Hope, G.B.; & Deller, Ernest G. (1945). The History of the Geelong Field Naturalists' Club, 1880-1932: excerpts and letters.

External links
 Geelong Field Naturalists Club

Nature conservation organisations based in Australia
Organisations based in Geelong
1961 establishments in Australia